Robert D. Simms (1926 – 2008) was a justice of the Oklahoma Supreme Court from 1972 to 1999. He served as chief justice in 1985 to 1986.

Robert D. Simms was born in Sand Springs, Tulsa County, Oklahoma on  February 6, 1926 in Tulsa. Son of Matthew Scott and Bessie L. (Moore) Simms. He attended Milligan College, Phillips University and got a Bachelor of Laws at Tulsa University. Served with United States Navy, 1943-1946.

Early life
Simms was a native of Sand Springs and graduated from Sand Springs High School in 1943. He won the Craftsman Award given to an outstanding senior boy.  He then attended Milligan College, a church related liberal arts college in eastern Tennessee, and Phillips University, another church-related school, in Enid, Oklahoma. Judge Simms received his law degree from the University of Tulsa College of Law in 1950.In 1975 he received a TU College of Law Annual Faculty and Alumni Award for his outstanding service to the legal profession.

Career in law
Starting in 1950 he began private law practice in Sand Springs. He became Assistant Tulsa County Attorney (1953-1954), Chief Prosecutor in County Attorney's office (1955-1958) Tulsa County Attorney (1958-1962), and judge of the Oklahoma District Court, District 14, (1962-1971), Oklahoma Court Criminal Appeals (1971-1972) and justice of the Oklahoma Supreme Court, (1985—2000). Member Oklahoma Crime Commission.

He spent one year on the state Court of Criminal Appeals before his appointment to the Oklahoma Supreme Court in 1972. He served as the chief justice in 1985 and 1986. He retired in October 1999. Governor Frank Keating appointed Daniel J. Boudreau to fill the vacancy created by Simms' retirement.

Post-retirement Multicounty Grand Jury
In 2001, after Robert Simms had retired from the bench, his judicial talents were summoned again for a special service. The Oklahoma Supreme Court, in October 2001, and the Oklahoma Attorney General had authorized the empaneling of a Multicounty Grand Jury (MGJ) to investigate a variety of offenses in all seventy-seven counties of the state. Simms was named as presiding judge of the MGJ. The list of offenses that the MGJ investigated was extremely wide-ranging, including "... murder, rape, bribery, extortion, arson, perjury, fraud, embezzlement, violations of the Uniform Controlled Dangerous Substances Act, organized crime, public corruption, securities violations, and crimes involving the sale or purchase of goods or services by state and local subdivisions."

The MGJ's activities resulted in 10 indictments, containing 115 separate counts against 17 individuals. These were delivered to the state Attorney General for prosecution or further investigation. The MGJ also recommend certain changes in state laws to clarify the requirements of agency employees.

In its conclusion, the final report stated that the MGJ stated, "...the Multicounty Grand Jury is an essential and invaluable tool for law enforcement in the State of Oklahoma. Information and evidence were obtained, and cases solved, that would likely not have been otherwise due to the use of the subpoena and investigatory powers of the Multicounty Grand Jury. We believe it is a process which should be continued, funded and fully supported by the citizens, Legislature, Governor, judiciary and law enforcement community of the State.

Family
Simms married Patricia J. Cook in Sand Springs, Tulsa County, Oklahoma on February 12, 1951. They had one son, Robert Simms, Jr., who is married and has two sons.

Notes

References

Justices of the Oklahoma Supreme Court
1926 births
2008 deaths
People from Tulsa County, Oklahoma
University of Tulsa College of Law alumni
20th-century American judges